Polyoxyethylene stearate is a non-ionic surfactant, which is permitted for use as the E number food additive E431.

References

E-number additives
Stearate esters